Urea, also known as carbamide-containing cream, is used as a medication and applied to the skin to treat dryness and itching such as may occur in psoriasis, dermatitis, or ichthyosis. It may also be used to soften nails.

In adults side  effects are generally few. It may occasionally cause skin irritation. Urea works in part by loosening dried skin. Preparations generally contain 5 to 50% urea.

Urea containing creams have been used since the 1940s. It is on the World Health Organization's List of Essential Medicines. It is available over the counter.

Medical uses
Urea cream is indicated for debridement and promotion of normal healing of skin areas with hyperkeratosis, particularly where healing is inhibited by local skin infection, skin necrosis, fibrinous or itching debris or eschar. Specific condition with hyperkeratosis where urea cream is useful include:
 Dry skin and rough skin
 Dermatitis
 Psoriasis
 Ichthyosis
 Eczema
 Keratosis
 Keratoderma
 Corns
 Calluses
 Damaged, ingrown and devitalized nails

Side effects
Common side effects of urea cream are:
 Mild skin irritation
 Temporary burning sensation
 Stinging sensation
 Itching

In severe cases, there can be an allergic reaction with symptoms such as skin rash, urticaria, difficulty breathing and swelling of the mouth, face, lips, or tongue.

Mechanism of action
Urea in low doses is a humectant while at high doses (above 20%) it causes breakdown of protein in the skin.

Urea dissolves the intercellular matrix of the cells of the stratum corneum, promoting desquamation of scaly skin, eventually resulting in softening of hyperkeratotic areas. In nails, urea causes softening and eventually debridement of the nail plate.

References

External links
 

Dermatologic drugs
Ureas
World Health Organization essential medicines
Wikipedia medicine articles ready to translate